Connecticut's 56th House of Representatives district elects one member of the Connecticut House of Representatives. It encompasses parts of the town of Vernon and has been represented by Democrat Mike Winkler since 2017.

Recent elections

2020

2018

2016

2014

2012

References

56